John Forester (7 October 1929 – 14 April 2020) was an English industrial engineer, specializing in bicycle transportation engineering.  A cycling activist, he was known as "the father of vehicular cycling", for creating the Effective Cycling program of bicycle training along with its associated book of the same title, and for coining the phrase "the vehicular cycling principle" – "Cyclists fare best when they act and are treated as drivers of vehicles". His published works also included Bicycle Transportation: A Handbook for Cycling Transportation Engineers.

Early life
Born in East Dulwich, London, England, Forester was the elder son of the writer and novelist C. S. Forester and his wife Kathleen. He moved with his family to Berkeley, California, in March 1940 and attended public schools there until after his parents' divorce, when he finished high school at a preparatory school on the East Coast. He later attended the University of California at Berkeley, starting as a physics major, but graduating with a bachelor's degree in English in August, 1951. Following a brief stint in the U.S. Navy in the early 1950s during the Korean War, Forester eventually settled in California to become, as he described it, "an industrial engineer, a senior research engineer, a professor, and, of all things, an expert in the science of bicycling".

In April 1966, Forester's father died. The unexpectedly large estate, its contents, and its disposition proved to Forester that his father, whom he had loved and admired, had consistently lied to him for years, and strongly suggested evidence of another secret life. That discovery was a traumatic experience, and led to his two-volume biography of his father, Novelist and Story Teller: The Life of C. S. Forester.

Cycling advocacy

Forester was a passionate cyclist from childhood.  He became a cycling activist in 1971, after being ticketed in Palo Alto, California for riding his bicycle on the street instead of a recently legislated separate bikeway for that section of the street, the sidewalk.  He contested the ticket and the city ordinance was overturned.  His first published article—the first of his many publications on alternatives to bikeways over the following four decades—appeared in the February 1973 issue of Bike World, a regional Northern California bimonthly magazine.

In May 1973, his focus broadened as the Food and Drug Administration (later the Consumer Product Safety Commission, or CPSC) issued extensive product safety regulations for bicycles. Originally intended only for children's bicycles, the regulations were soon expanded to include all bicycles except for track bikes and custom-assembled bicycles. That October, Forester published an article in Bike World denouncing both the California Department of Transportation and the CPSC. He targeted the new CPSC regulations, especially the "eight reflector" system, which required front, rear, wheel and pedal reflectors. The front reflector replaced the bicycle headlight. Forester argued that motor vehicle drivers about to cross the path of the cyclist would not see the cyclist because the headlights of their motor vehicle did not shine onto the front reflector of the bicycle, often resulting in a crash. (Only if the bicycle was directly in front of the car and only if the bicycle was headed the wrong way, would the car's headlights illuminate the bicycle's front reflector, until the inevitable head-on crash.)

After the rules were finalized, Forester sued the CPSC. Acting as his own lawyer (pro se), Forester did not understand that United States federal law did not grant jurisdiction to the appeals court to review the technical merit of the rules (a so-called "de novo" review) unless the procedure used to create the rules was flawed. The CPSC argued that a challenger must prove the process was "arbitrary and capricious." The judge ordered a de novo review of the rules; threw out four of them, but left the "eight reflector" standard untouched. Forester, emboldened by this partial success, proceeded to launch further challenges to administrative rules in court, but did not duplicate that early success.  His legal advocacy remains highly controversial.

Famously abrasive and inflexible, Forester was critical of Dutch cycleways, stating them to be dangerous despite never having cycled in the Netherlands.

In addition to legal advocacy, Forester was known for his theories regarding cycling safety. His Effective Cycling educational program, developed after his research which claimed that integrating motorists and educated cyclists reduced accidents more than creating separate bicycle lanes, was implemented by the League of American Bicyclists (formerly, the League of American Wheelmen) until Forester withdrew his permission for that organization to use the name.

Death
Forester died of complications related to a lingering flu on April 19, 2020, at the age of 90.

Bibliography
 Statistical Selection of Business Strategies Chicago, Richard D. Irwin, 1968 Lib Cong 67-17054
 Bicycle Transportation (First edition, 1977; Second edition 1994, The MIT Press)
 Effective Cycling  (First edition, 1976; Sixth edition, MIT Press, 1993), 7th (2012) 
 Effective Cycling Program, Effective Cycling Instructor's Manual, the film Bicycling Safely On The Road (Iowa State University, 1978)
 Effective Cycling, The Movie, (Seidler Productions, 1992)
 Novelist & Story Teller, The Life of C. S. Forester. Lake Oswego, OR: eNet Press, 2013.  Ebook reprint of self-published (2000) two-volume biography of his father.

See also 
 Outline of cycling

References

Further reading

External links
 John Forester's web site (archived)
 ProBicycle biography of John Forester
  60 min. Closed captioning. (video)
 Effective Cycling: The Cure for Un-riding! Review by Cycle California! Magazine.

1929 births
2020 deaths
American male cyclists
English emigrants to the United States
Vehicular cycling
People from the London Borough of Southwark
Cycling advocates
Cycling writers
United States Navy sailors